Marcelo Eduardo Montoya Jr (born 17 February 1996) is a Fijian professional rugby league footballer who plays as a er or  for the New Zealand Warriors in the NRL and Fiji at international level.

He previously played for the Canterbury-Bankstown Bulldogs in the National Rugby League.

Background
Montoya was born in Lautoka, Fiji to a Chilean father and Fijian mother, and moved to Campbelltown, New South Wales, Australia at the age of three.

He played his junior rugby league for the Bankstown Bulls, and attended Patrician Brothers' College, Fairfield.

Playing career

Early career
Montoya was signed by the Canterbury-Bankstown Bulldogs and played in their Harold Matthews Cup team. He progressed through Canterbury's youth system, and played in their NYC team between 2014 and 2016, scoring 36 tries in 46 matches. The captain of the NYC team in 2016, he also played seven games in Canterbury's New South Wales Cup team that year, scoring six tries. On 8 October 2016, Montoya made his international debut for Fiji in an international against Samoa in Apia, playing on the wing and scoring a try in Fiji's 20–18 win.

2017
In February 2017, Montoya was named in Canterbury's 2017 NRL Auckland Nines squad. In round 3 of the 2017 NRL season, Montoya made his NRL debut for the Bulldogs against the New Zealand Warriors where he played on the wing and scored a try in the 24-12 win at Forsyth Barr Stadium in Dunedin, New Zealand. He is the first player of Chilean and South American descent to play in the NRL. He scored his first career double against the Newcastle Knights on the 7th April 2017 in a 22 points to 12 win.

On 6 June, Montoya re-signed with the Canterbury-Bankstown Bulldogs for a further three seasons until the end of 2020.

After a successful opening season in Montoya's career, the Canterbury-Bankstown Bulldogs named him the NRL Rookie of the year.

2018
In 2018, Montoya made 15 appearances for Canterbury and scored two tries.  In September 2018, Montoya and other Canterbury players celebrated Mad Monday at The Harbour View Hotel in Sydney's CBD.  Later in the night, photographs provided by the media showed Canterbury players heavily intoxicated, stripping naked and vomiting in the street.  Montoya was pictured on the street asleep by photographers after vomiting earlier.  Montoya was handed a fine of $10,000 ($5000 suspended) by the club for his involvement.

2019
Montoya played the first two games of the 2019 season at centre as Canterbury suffered back to back heavy defeats against the New Zealand Warriors and the Parramatta Eels.  Montoya was subsequently one of five players demoted to reserve grade by coach Dean Pay.

After spending 7 weeks in reserve grade, Montoya was recalled to the Canterbury side for their Round 9 match against the Newcastle Knights which Canterbury lost 22-10 at Suncorp Stadium.

In Round 18 against Brisbane, Montoya was taken from the field during the club's 28-6 loss with an apparent leg injury.  Scans later revealed that Montoya would be ruled out for the rest of the season after it was shown he had tears to his posterior cruciate ligament, lateral ligament and medial meniscal ligament.

2020
Montoya made his return for Canterbury in round 8 of the 2020 NRL season, scoring a try in a 26-10 loss against Souths.  In round 10 against St. George and with the scores locked at 22-22, Canterbury spread the ball left and a routine pass was thrown to Montoya who in turn dropped the ball.  Saints player Corey Norman picked up the loose ball and raced away to score the match winning try on the full-time siren.

On 22 September, it was revealed that Montoya would be released by Canterbury at the end of the 2020 NRL season.  Montoya was one of eight players who were released as the club looked to rebuild for the 2021 season.

2021
In round 4 of the 2021 NRL season, Montoya made his club debut against the Sydney Roosters.
In round 11 of the 2021 NRL season, Montoya scored two tries in a 30-26 victory over the Wests Tigers.

2022 
In round 5 of the 2022 NRL season, Montoya used a homophobic slur against North Queensland winger Kyle Feldt in a match between their sides. The comment was picked up by in-game audio. Montoya was referred to the NRL judiciary and entered an early guilty plea. He was suspended for four matches.
In round 10, Montaya scored two tries for New Zealand in their 32-30 loss against South Sydney.
Montoya made a total of 18 appearances for the New Zealand club as they finished 15th on the table.

2023
In round 3 of the 2023 NRL season, Montoya scored two tries for New Zealand in a 26-12 upset victory over North Queensland.

Personal life
As of May 2015, Montoya is working as a teacher's aide at Casula Public School. He has been an ambassador for Latin Heat Rugby League.

References

External links
Canterbury Bulldogs profile
 Bulldogs profile
NRL profile
2017 RLWC profile

1996 births
Living people
Fijian people of Chilean descent
Fijian emigrants to Australia
Fijian rugby league players
Fiji national rugby league team players
Canterbury-Bankstown Bulldogs players
New Zealand Warriors players
Rugby league wingers
Rugby league fullbacks
Sportspeople from Lautoka